Sang Chun Lee (January 15, 1954 – October 19, 2004), most commonly known simply as Sang Lee, was a Korean-born American professional three-cushion billiards player and world champion.

Professional career
Born and raised in South Korea, Lee moved to New York City, United States, in 1987, at age 33.

Dubbed the "Michael Jordan of three-cushion billiards" at the time of his arrival in the United States, Lee already had eight Korean national titles under his belt. Lee promptly went on to dominate three cushion billiards in the US, winning a record twelve consecutive USBA National Three-Cushion Championship, from 1990 to 2001.

Lee became the UMB World Three-cushion Championship in 1993.

in 1999 he was ranked number 11 among the Billiards Digest "50 Greatest Players of the Century" and ranked 5th "Greatest Living Player of the Century"

At the 2002 USBA National Three-Cushion Championship, his impressive run came to an end when he was defeated by Pedro Piedrabuena in the finals. Aptly, Piedrabuena received his early training in billiards from none other than Lee. The same year, Lee finished 2nd in Three-cushion event of the Asian Games where he was bested by Deuk-Hee Hwang, another Korean cue artist.

As a player, Lee's ambition was "making billiards beautiful in America", – restoring the recognition and competitive level of three-cushion in that part of the world – but he did not live to fulfill it, as he died in 2004 due to stomach cancer.

On May 15, 2007, Lee was inducted into the BCA Hall of Fame.

Sang Lee International Open
Each year after Lee's death, a tournament featuring many of the world's best three-cushion players, known as the Sang Lee International Open, has been hosted at Carom Café in Flushing, Queens, New York, the billiard hall Lee was a co-owner of at the time of his death. 2012 it has been renamed to Verhoeven Open.

References

External links 

 2002 USBA Championship results
 Sang Lee International Tournament Official Site
 Photos from Sang Lee International Open 2008 
 Carom Cafe Online Billiard Resource 

American carom billiards players
South Korean carom billiards players
World Cup champions in three-cushion billiards
1954 births
2004 deaths
Place of birth missing
Place of death missing
Deaths from stomach cancer
Asian Games medalists in cue sports
Asian Games silver medalists for South Korea
Medalists at the 2002 Asian Games
Cue sports players at the 2002 Asian Games
World Games bronze medalists
Competitors at the 2001 World Games
South Korean emigrants to the United States